Le Droit des femmes (Women's Rights) was a French feminist journal that appeared from 1869 to 1891. It was founded and edited by Léon Richer, and in the early days supported financially by Maria Deraismes. The newspaper supported many women's causes, but always avoided directly supporting women's suffrage. It was one of the longest running journals of its type in the 19th century.

History

The first issue of Le Droit des femmes appeared on 10 April 1869. Léon Richer was the editor-in-chief.
Richer edited the paper and wrote most of the content.
He was a free-thinker and feminist who worked closely with Maria Deraismes.
Desraismes helped fund the paper, to which she also contributed. Julie-Victoire Daubié wrote several economic and feminist pieces for the journal.
Le Droit des Femmes  was suspended on 11 August 1870 during the Franco-Prussian War (1870–71). 
The newspaper reappeared as the Avenir des femmes (Women's future) on 24 September 1871. 
This was a somewhat less assertive name.

In the mid-1870s Eugénie Potonié-Pierre became secretary of Le Droit des femmes and a regular contributor to the journal.
Desraismes and Richer organized a Women's Rights conference in July–August 1878.
After this conference, Richer reverted to the original title of Le Droit des Femmes. 
The first issue of the new Droit des femmes appeared on 5 January 1879.
In December 1891 Le Droit des Femmes ceased publication and Richer retired from the feminist movement.
Le Droit des Femmes had been one of the longest-running feminist journals of the 19th century.
It was mentioned as one of the eight main journals of the century in Alison Finch's "Women's Writing in Nineteenth-Century France".

Content

Published in Paris, Le Droit des femmes covered policy reviews, as well as literary, social, and economic news. The purpose of the weekly newspaper was to campaign for reform of women's legal rights. Demands included establishment of a family council that would help women whose husbands or fathers were abusive, better education for girls, higher wages for women to reduce the need for prostitution, equal wages for equal work, admission of qualified women to the professions, women's control of property and wealth and revisions to the Civil Code. The paper did not demand women's suffrage, which Richer always claimed to support but always in practice found reasons to oppose.

References

Sources

 

1869 establishments in France
1891 disestablishments in France
Defunct magazines published in France
Feminism in France
Feminist magazines
French-language magazines
Magazines established in 1869
Magazines disestablished in 1891
Magazines published in Paris
Weekly magazines published in France
Women's magazines published in France